Laminin subunit gamma-1 is a protein that in humans is encoded by the LAMC1 gene.

Laminins, a family of extracellular matrix glycoproteins, are the major noncollagenous constituent of basement membranes. They have been implicated in a wide variety of biological processes including cell adhesion, differentiation, migration, signaling, neurite outgrowth and metastasis. Laminins are composed of 3 non identical chains: laminin alpha, beta and gamma (formerly A, B1, and B2, respectively) and they form a cruciform structure consisting of 3 short arms, each formed by a different chain, and a long arm composed of all 3 chains. Each laminin chain is a multidomain protein encoded by a distinct gene. Several isoforms of each chain have been described. Different alpha, beta and gamma chain isomers combine to give rise to different heterotrimeric laminin isoforms which are designated by Arabic numerals in the order of their discovery, i.e. alpha1beta1gamma1 heterotrimer is laminin 1. The biological functions of the different chains and trimer molecules are largely unknown, but some of the chains have been shown to differ with respect to their tissue distribution, presumably reflecting diverse functions in vivo. This gene encodes the gamma chain isoform laminin, gamma 1. The gamma 1 chain, formerly thought to be a beta chain, contains structural domains similar to beta chains, however, lacks the short alpha region separating domains I and II. The structural organization of this gene also suggested that it had diverged considerably from the beta chain genes. Embryos of transgenic mice in which both alleles of the gamma 1 chain gene were inactivated by homologous recombination, lacked basement membranes, indicating that laminin, gamma 1 chain is necessary for laminin heterotrimer assembly. It has been inferred by analogy with the strikingly similar 3' UTR sequence in mouse laminin gamma 1 cDNA, that multiple polyadenylation sites are utilized in human to generate the 2 different sized mRNAs (5.5 and 7.5 kb) seen on Northern analysis.

References

Further reading

Laminins